Cadets is a sitcom pilot, which aired on ABC as a summer special on September 25, 1988. The pilot, however, was not picked up.

Plot
Spunky, immature 13-year-old Tyler McKay has grown up in various public institutions after being abandoned as a small child in the big city. Her guardians decide to enroll her at a very strict, regimental military academy known as Appromattox, which has just begun to accept girls.

Cast and characters
Soleil Moon Frye as Tyler McKay
Richard Roundtree as Sergeant Matt Gideon
Barclay DeVeau as Lucy Lomparski
Jaleel White as Cadet Nicholls
William Sadler as Colonel Tom Sturdivant 
Remy Auberjonois as Squad Leader Brigham
Michael Goldstrom as Anthony Libonati
Corin Nemec as Cadet Preston Langly 
Judd Trichter as Cadet Goerke

References

External links

1988 television specials
Television pilots not picked up as a series
Military comedy television series
American Broadcasting Company television specials
1980s American sitcoms